Typhlodaphne paratenoceras is a species of sea snail, a marine gastropod mollusk in the family Borsoniidae.

Description
The length of the shell attains 43.5 mm.

Distribution
This marine species occurs off the South Shetlands; the Scotia Ridge in the Scotia Sea; Antarctic Peninsula

References

 Powell A. W. B. (1951). Antarctic and Subantarctic Mollusca: Pelecypoda and Gastropoda. Discovery Reports, 26: 47-196, pl. 5-10

External links
 
 Gastropods.com: Typhlodaphne paratenoceras
 Kantor Y.I., Harasewych M.G. & Puillandre N. (2016). A critical review of Antarctic Conoidea (Neogastropoda). Molluscan Research. 36(3): 153-206

paratenoceras
Gastropods described in 1951